Pegas 2000 SRO is a Czech aircraft manufacturer based in Prague. The company specializes in the design and manufacture of paragliders in the form of ready-to-fly aircraft. The company also builds powered paragliding wings and parafoil kites.

The company is a společnost s ručením omezeným (SRO), a Czech limited company.

History
The company was founded in 1989 and in 1990 started its own paraglider flight training school and also introduced its first elliptical planform glider, the Pegas Fazole. In 1994 the company developed its own paraglider design software, which allowed designing diagonal ribs and other features only possible with computer modelling.

In 1993 the company started developing parafoil kites for kite surfing and kite snowboarding, establishing a school for kite boarding in 2002.

In 1999 the company introduced the Pegas Pony, a glider that became a benchmark.

By the mid 2000s the company was producing the beginner Pegas Arcus, intermediate Avis and Bain, the cross country Bellus and the competition Certus. A two-place glider, the Discus was also in the catalogue.

Aircraft 
Summary of aircraft built by Pegas 2000:
Pegas Arcus
Pegas Avis
Pegas Bain
Pegas Bellus
Pegas Certus
Pegas Discus
Pegas Fazole
Pegas One
Pegas Pony
Pegas Power
Pegas Revo

References

External links

Aircraft manufacturers of the Czech Republic and Czechoslovakia
Ultralight aircraft
Paragliders
Companies established in 1989
1989 establishments in Czechoslovakia